Mustafa El Khani (born 1 January 1979 in Damascus) is a Syrian actor with Kurdish roots. El Khani graduated from the Higher Institute for Dramatic Arts in Damascus. He played leading roles in several TV series for several TV channels in the Middle East. He used to be the son-in-law of Bashar Jaafari.

His works

In TV
 Al fawares – 1999
 AlZeer Salem – 2000
 Salah Al-deen Al-Ayyobi (TV series) – 2001
 Houlagou Khan – 2002
 Abed Ramadi Aswoad – 2002
 Bnat Keekoz – 2003
 Rabea Cordoba – 2003 
 Alzaher Bibars – 2005 
 Qurn Almaez – 2005 
 Saqf al-Alam – 2006 
 Bab Al-Hara season 4 – 2009
 Bab Al-Hara season 5 – 2010
 Bab Al-Hara season 6 – 2014
 Bab Al-Hara season 7 – 2015
 Bab Al-Hara season 8 – 2016
 Bab Al-Hara season 9 – 2017

References

1979 births
Living people
21st-century Syrian male actors
Syrian actors
Syrian male film actors